Irtiqa (Urdu: ارتقاء, literal English translation: evolution) is the debut album by the Pakistani rock band, Entity Paradigm. It was originally slated for a 25 September 2003 release date, but was delayed to 1 October. Entity Paradigm released singles from Irtiqa which were "Hamesha", "Hamein Aazma", "Kahan Hai Tu", "Aghosh", "Waqt" and "Irtiqa III"; the videos for "Waqt" and "Irtiqa III" were directed by Xulfi himself.

Singles like "Waqt", "Hamesha" and "Kahan Hai Tu" did well in the charts. Irtiqa was considered a critical and commercial success.

Concept
Irtiqa means 'progress' or 'evolution', and this album talks about progress in life. The cover of the album depicts a sketch of an unborn baby. The first track 'Irtiqa I' starts off the album with a soft voice of a newly born baby, indirectly pointing towards progress after birth. The songs that follow after are carefully composed and it seems that EP strictly means business. Songs like "Hamain Aazma" and "Kahan Hai Tu" sound somewhat similar as far as the beginning is concerned but as the tracks unfold either one follow their own unique blend of heavy guitar notes and drums. Most of the tracks do follow the heavy metal/progressive rock genre of music but a couple songs like "Waqt" and "Aghosh" take a slightly lighter tone while at the same time never losing their metallic touch.

On the whole "Irtiqa" is not just a music album, it's a concept, it's a theme and not many musicians in Pakistan making music is based on a specific theme or subject and be able to maintain that theme throughout the album but not just in a single song.

Track listing
All music composed & arranged by Zulfiqar Jabbar Khan, Fawad Khan & Ahmed Ali Butt.

Personnel
All information is taken from the CD.

Entity Paradigm
 Fawad Khan: lead vocals
 Waqar Ahmed Khan: drums
 Zulfiqar Jabbar Khan: lead guitar, vocals
 Ahmed Ali Butt: vocals, keyboard
 Salman Albert: rhythm, vocals, drums
 Sajjad Ali Khan: bass guitar
 Hassan Khalid: rhythm guitar

Production
Produced by Mekaal Hasan, Fawad Khan & Zulfiqar J. Khan
Recorded & Mixed at Digital Fidelity Studios, Lahore, Punjab
Guitar sound engineer: Mekaal Hasan, Fawad Khan & Zulfiqar
Drums reprogrammed: Fawad Khan
Drums sound engineer: Fawad Khan & Zulfiqar J. Khan
Assisted by Mekaal Hasan
Photography: Usman Saeed
Art direction & design: Safwat Saleem
Album art: Tania Danish
Inlay illustrations: Safwat Saleem

External links
 
 Guitar Tabs for Entity Paradigm
 Official website

2003 debut albums
Entity Paradigm albums
Urdu-language albums